The British credit crisis of 1772-1773 also known as the crisis of 1772, or the panic of 1772, was a peacetime financial crisis which originated in London and then spread to Scotland and the Dutch Republic. It has been described as the first modern banking crisis faced by the Bank of England. New colonies, as Adam Smith observed, had an insatiable demand for capital. Accompanying the more tangible evidence of wealth creation was a rapid expansion of credit and banking leading to a rash of speculation and dubious financial innovation (venture capitalism). In today’s language, they bought shares on margin.

In June 1772 Alexander Fordyce lost £300,000 shorting East India Company stock, leaving his partners Henry Neale, William James and Richard Down liable for an estimated £243,000 in debts. As this information became public  within two weeks eight banks in London, and later around 20 banks across Europe collapsed. According to Paul Kosmetatos "lurid tales abounded in the press for a time of merchants cutting their throats, shooting or hanging themselves". In 1960 it was believed the boom and subsequent crisis were most pronounced in Scotland. It certainly triggered a liquidity crunch in Amsterdam in December, but the effects were of short duration. In the end, none of them actually lost money. The credit boom came to an abrupt end, and the ensuing crisis harmed the East India Trading Company, the West Indies in general, and the North American colonial planters specifically.

Before the crisis

From the mid-1760s to the early 1770s, the credit boom, supported by merchants and bankers, facilitated the expansion of manufacturing, mining and internal improvements in both Britain and the thirteen colonies. Until the outbreak of the credit crisis, the period from 1770 to 1772 was considered prosperous and politically calm in both Britain and the American colonies. As the result of the Townshend Act and the breakdown of the Boston Non-importation agreement, the period was marked with a tremendous growth in exports from Britain to the American colonies. Exports to North America increased rapidly compared to imports to North America between 1750 and 1772. These massive exports were supported by credit that British merchants granted to American planters. The Physiocrats believed in land development and agriculture.

Problems, however, lay behind the credit boom and the prosperity of both British and colonial economies: speculation and the establishment of dubious financial institutions. For example, in Scotland, bankers adopted "the notorious practice of drawing and redrawing fictitious bills of exchange…in an effort to expand credit". For the purpose of increasing the supply of money, the bank of Douglas, Heron & Company, known as the "Ayr Bank", was established in Ayr, Scotland in 1769; however, after the original capital was exhausted, the firm raised money by a chain of bills on London. Hamilton has explained how a chain of bills works, "A, say in Edinburgh, drew a bill on his agent B in London, payable in two months. Before payment was due B redrew on A for the same sum plus interest and commission. Meantime A discounted his bill in Edinburgh and before the two months were up he drew another bill on B and so on". This method could only temporarily support economic development, yet it promoted false optimism in the market. The warning signals of the impending crisis, such as the overstocked shelves and warehouses in the colonies, were completely overlooked by British merchants and American planters.

Effects in London

In July 1770 Alexander Fordyce collaborated with two planters on Grenada and borrowed 240,000 guilders in bearer bonds from Hope & Co. in Amsterdam; he was backed by Harman and Co. and Sir William Pulteney. He was a partner in the banking house Neale, James, Fordyce and Downe in Threadneedle Street (London), and correspondent of the (large) Ayr Bank. He bet heavily against EIC share price, which went awfully awry. Fordyce had speculated away the bank's assets. On Monday 8 June 1772, it became clear Fordyce failed. The next day he fled to France to avoid debt repayment. He used the profits from other investments to cover the losses. The initial distress in London peaked on 22 June (Black Monday). The whole City of London was in uproar when Fordyce was declared bankrupt. His goods and estate were seized and Neale, James, Fordyce and Down, the largest buyer of Scottish bills, were forced to insolvency. 

There was great uncertainty about the size of the shock. Economic growth at that period was highly dependent on the use of credit, which was largely based upon people’s confidence in the banks. As confidence started ebbing, paralysis of the credit system followed: crowds of people (creditors) gathered at the banks and requested debt repayment in cash or attempted to withdraw their deposits. As a result, twenty important banking houses went bankrupt by the end of June, and many other firms endured hardships during the crisis. At that time, the Gentleman's Magazine commented, "No event for 50 years past has been remembered to have given so fatal a blow both to trade and public credit". In the first week of January 1773, trade and finance between London and Amsterdam came to a halt. The Bank of England came to the rescue on Sunday 10 January, allowing anyone who wished to withdraw specie from the bank to do so. Many British merchants quickly sent money to their ailing Dutch correspondents. The strain upon the reserves of the Bank of England was not eased until towards the end of 1773.

After the crisis, a dramatic rise in the number of bankruptcies was observed: the average number of bankruptcies in London was 310 from 1764 to 1771, but the number rose to 484 in 1772 and 556 in 1773. Banks that were deeply involved in speculation endured hard times during the crisis. For example, the partners of the Ayr Bank paid no less than £663,397 in order to fully repay their creditors. Owing to this process, only 112 out of 226 partners remained solvent by August 1775. In contrast, banks that had never engaged in speculation did not bear any losses and gained prestige for their outstanding performance despite the turbulence.

In December 1774 Fordyce was forced to sell his estate in Roehampton to Sir Joshua Vanneck, 1st Baronet; the plaintiffs were Hope & Co and Harman and Co.

Effects in Scotland

In November 1769 the moneyed interests in Scotland founded the Ayr Bank to assume many of the responsibilities associated with a central bank, principally standing ready to advance notes to Scottish banks as a 'lender of last resort.' Like other banks established in the form of limited liability companies, the Ayr Bank had the right to put banknotes into circulation, which power it used excessively. By 1772 the Ayr bank had branches in Edinburgh and Dumfries, as well as representative offices in Glasgow, Inverness, Kelso, Montrose, Campbeltown, and several other places. Among the company's 139 shareholders were well-known people such as the Duke of Buccleuch, the Earl of Dumfries, the Earl of March, Sir Adam Fergusson, Patrick Heron and Archibald Douglas, but no bankers. 

On 12 June the news of the failure of Neale, James, Fordyce and Downe reached Scotland. After the weekend a run began on its Edinburgh branch. The Ayr bank collapsed on 24 June, bringing other smaller banks down with it  having extended credit too liberally to colonial planters.  It was said that the Scotch have ten times more paper money in proportion to their specie, than ever the English had. The collapse of the bank was a major blow to the great Scottish landowning families, but seems to have hit the Scottish economy mildly. The Ayr bank managed to reopen for a brief period between September 1772 and August 1773, but a general meeting of the partners held on 12 August decided to dissolve the Company permanently. The bank may have actually spurred the economic development of Scotland, but its failure weakened public confidence in land banking schemes, leaving gold and silver as the most acceptable security for bank notes. 

According to Adam Smith, in 1773 busy writing The Wealth of Nations: "Being the managers rather of other people's money than of their own, it cannot be well expected, that they should watch over it with the same anxious vigilance with which the partners in a private co-partnery frequently watch over their own." In his History of Banking in Scotland (Chapter X) Andrew William Kerr wrote:

According to Kosmetatos existing literature dealing with aspects of the episode—no comprehensive coverage exists up to now.

Effects on Europe

Around 1770, mortgaging became very widespread; in the same year the Van Aerssen van Sommelsdijck family managed to sell its share to the city of Amsterdam in Suriname. The negotiations set up by the Cliffords in Surinam, the Van Seppenwoldes, Ter Borch, Hope & Co on Grenada, Sint Eustatius, and Saint Croix issued bonds to finance the loans. Such packages could contain loans to 20 or more plantations and before 1772 at least 40 of these bundles were issued, their names as unspecific as L.a. A, B or C. Investors thus had little knowledge of what they invested in, and lent their money purely on good faith and the word of the fund director. The Dutch fund managers, were also hit personally once their subprime system met its inevitable demise. In December 1772 Clifford & Co, a well established Amsterdam banking firm which obtained plantation loans as part of its portfolio declared insolvency. 

The plantation mortgages had many features in common with the subprime mortgages on American houses.  Historians, notably Charles P. Kindleberger, have pointed out that crises often follow soon after major financial or technical innovations that present investors with new types of financial opportunities, which he called "displacements" of investors' expectations.  In January the Bank of Amsterdam funded a city-operated loan facility for distressed merchants.  The merchant banking firm Clifford & Sons broke eventually followed by more of its counterparts like Herman & Johan van Seppenwolde, and Abraham Ter Borch. The credit crunch was a real disaster for the Dutch plantation colonies in the West Indies and particularly for Surinam, where colonial agriculture was almost exclusively carried out with credit from Amsterdam. 

 In Amsterdam  a worse catastrophe was averted by rapid imports of precious metals. In January 1773 Joshua Vanneck and his brother were involved (by Thomas Walpole) when British merchants sent ₤500,000, gold and piastre to Amsterdam.

A few bankruptcies also shook the economies of Stockholm and St. Petersburg a little later, but overall Europe got off relatively lightly. The Danish Kurantbanken was nationalized in March 1773 with the assistance of Heinrich Carl von Schimmelmann; the shareholders received the fixed interest bonds instead of shares on plantations in the Danish West Indies. Clifford was insolvent  and given postponement of payment. Hope & Co. the leading banking house suffered from a bad deal and the fall of the EIC-stocks. The turnover with the Amsterdam Exchange Bank plummeted from more than 50 million guilders in 1772 to 30 million in 1773. In 1774 Fordyce was forced to sell his estate to Sir Joshua Vanneck, 1st Baronet; the plaintiffs were Hope & Co and Gurnell, Hoare, & Harman. George Colebrooke went bankrupt.

East India Company

The East India Company, formerly mainly a trading company with a limited territory, was now entrusted with the management of a much larger area, for which task its outdated organisation was not up to. At the London Stock Exchange, however, there was still the expectation that the Company would soon be paying higher dividends, an expectation shared by the Dutch capital owners who were used to investing part of their capital in English funds. This optimism gave rise to increasing speculation boom in the futures trade in securities in both London and Amsterdam. 

In May 1772 the EIC stock price rose significantly.   In summer the EIC's debt suddenly skyrocketed - in India alone, the company had bill debts of £1.2 million. Meanwhile, speculation in futures in East India stock had weakened the London money market. The Great Bengal famine of 1770, which was exacerbated by the actions of the East India Company, led to massive shortfalls in expected land values for the company.  The East India Company bore heavy losses and its stock price fell significantly. Hope & Co. was stuck with a considerable positions in EIC and BoE stock. On 19 September the value of its shares dropped by 14%. 

The root of this crisis in relation to the East India Company came from the prediction by Isaac de Pinto that ‘peace conditions plus an abundance of money would push East Indian shares to ‘exorbitant heights.’ As leading Dutch banking houses (Andries Pels and Clifford & Son) had invested extensively in the stock of the East India Company, they suffered the loss along with the other shareholders. In this manner, the credit crisis spread from London to Amsterdam.

The Regulating Act of 1773 significantly reformed the East India Company's practices. It was complemented by the Tea Act 1773, which had a principal objective that was to reduce the massive amount of tea held by the financially troubled British East India Company in its London warehouses and to help the financially struggling company survive. The East India Company had eighteen million pounds of tea sitting in British warehouses. A huge amount of tea as assets which were lying unsold.  Selling it in a hurry would do wonders for its finances. On 14 January 1773 the directors of the EIC asked for a government loan and unlimited access to the tea market in the American colonies, both of which were granted. In August the Bank of England assisted the EIC with a loan.

Effects on the Thirteen Colonies

The credit crisis of 1772 greatly deteriorated debtor-creditor relations between the thirteen American colonies and Britain, especially in the South. The southern colonies, which produced tobacco, rice, and indigo and exported them to Britain, were granted higher credit than the northern colonies, where competitive commodities were produced. (It was estimated that in 1776 the total amount of debt that British merchants claimed from the colonies equaled £2,958,390; Southern colonies had claims of £2,482,763, nearly 85 per cent of the total amount. Before the crisis, the commission system of trading prevailed in the southern plantation colonies. The merchants in London helped the planters sell their crops and shipped what planters wanted to purchase in London as returns. The commission equaled the price of the British goods minus the revenue of the crops. The planters were usually granted credit for twelve months without interest and at five per cent on the unpaid balance after the deadline.

News of the crash in Scotland reached Thomas Jefferson in a letter dated 8 July 1772. After the outbreak of the crisis, British merchants urgently called for debt repayment, and American planters faced the serious problem of how to pay the debt for several reasons. First, because of the economic boom before the crisis, planters were not prepared for large-scale debt liquidation. As the credit system broke down, bills of exchange were rejected and almost all heavy gold was sent to Britain in December 1773. Second, without the support of credit, planters were unable to continue producing and selling their goods. Since the whole market became crippled, the fallen price of their goods also intensified the pressure on planters. Owing to the crisis, the colonies endured hard times to maintain the balance of payments.

The crisis of 1772 also set off a chain of events related to the controversy over the colonial tea market. The East India Company was one of the firms that suffered the hardest hits in the crisis. Failing to pay or renew its loan from the Bank of England, the firm sought to sell its eighteen million pounds of tea from its British warehouses to the American colonies.  Back then the firm had to market its tea to the colonies through middlemen, so the high price made its tea unfavorable compared to the tea that was smuggled to, or was produced locally in, the colonies. In May 1773, however, the Parliament imposed a three pence tax for each pound of tea sold, and allowed the firm to sell directly through its own agents. The Tea Act reduced the tea price and enabled the East India Company’s monopoly over the local tea business in the colonial tea market. The Tea Act proved to be wildly unpopular in the colonies, leading to the infamous Boston Tea Party, which was a major precursor to the American Revolution. Furious about how British government and the East India Company controlled the colonial tea trade, citizens in Charleston, Philadelphia, New York and Boston rejected the imported tea, and these protests eventually led to the Boston Tea Party in December 1773. Bills of exchange had become so scarce by December 1773 that all of the dollars and heavy gold had been sent to Great Britain for remittance. The crisis also worsened the relationship of the North American colonies and Britain, due to the fact that it affected all 13 of the colonies, and due to the fact that the British were forced to introduce controversial legislation for the colonies in an attempt to remedy the crisis, which made the crisis one of the causes of the American Revolutionary War.

Further reading

 Geest, Patrick van der (2021) In Search of the First Domino: The Credit Crisis of 1772-1773 in a Global History Perspective
 Goodspeed, Tyler (2016) Legislating Instability
  Hoonhout, Bram (2013) The crisis of the subprime plantation mortgages in the Dutch West Indies, 1750-1775
 Jong, Abe de, Kooijmans, Tim and Koudijs, Peter (2020) Intermediation in Mortgage-Backed Securities: The Plantation Business of F.W. Hudig, 1759-1797 . Available at SSRN: https://ssrn.com/abstract=3610648 or http://dx.doi.org/10.2139/ssrn.3610648
 Kosmetatos, Paul  (2018) Last resort lending before Henry Thornton? The Bank of England’s role in containing the 1763 and 1772–1773 British credit crises, European Review of Economic History.
 Koudijs, Peter and Hans-Joachim Voth (2011) Optimal delay: distressed trading in 18th c. Amsterdam
 Koudijs, Peter (2011) Trading and Financial Market Efficiency in Eighteenth Century Holland

 Narron, James and David Skeie (2014) Crisis Chronicles: The Credit and Commercial Crisis of 1772
 Rockoff, Huge (2009) UPON DAEDALIAN WINGS OF PAPER MONEY: ADAM SMITH AND THE CRISIS OF 1772
 Rudd, Joanna The International Lender of Last Resort- An Historical Perspective
 Sheridan, Richard B. “The British Credit Crisis of 1772 and The American Colonies.” The Journal of Economic History, vol. 20, no. 2, 1960, pp. 161–86, http://www.jstor.org/stable/2114853. Accessed 9 Apr. 2022.

References

Financial crises
1772 in economics
1773 in economics
1772 in Great Britain
1773 in Great Britain
Economic history of the United Kingdom